The Hawaii Rainbow Warriors college football team competes as part of the NCAA Division I Football Bowl Subdivision (FBS), representing the University of Hawaiʻi at Mānoa in the Mountain West Conference (MW). Since the establishment of the team in 1909, Hawaii has appeared in 14 bowl games. Hawaii also has an appearance in a Bowl Championship Series (BCS) game as a "BCS Buster" for the 2008 Sugar Bowl against Georgia. The latest bowl occurred on December 24, 2020, when Hawai'i beat Houston 28-14 in the 2020 New Mexico Bowl. The win brought the Rainbow Warriors' overall bowl record to eight wins and six losses (8–6).

Key

Bowl games

Notes

References
General

Specific

Hawaii

Hawaii Rainbow Warriors bowl games